Rene Haas (born 1962/1963) is the American chief executive officer (CEO) of Arm Ltd. since February 2022. He leads Arm from offices in California while the company headquarters remains in Cambridge, UK.

Haas worked for Nvidia for seven years, rising to vice president and general manager of its computing products business. He joined Arm in 2013, rising to president of the Arm IP Products Group (IPG) in 2017.

On February 8, 2022, Haas succeeded Simon Segars as CEO with immediate effect, as Segars was leaving Arm for personal reasons. Haas reformed his leadership team within a few weeks, letting go three executives. Haas will focus on taking Arm to its initial public offering (IPO).

Haas is an electronics engineering graduate of Clarkson University in upstate New York, and he holds a masters degree from Stanford Graduate School of Business. He led the sales division of Tensilica for five years beginning in 1999, then in 2004–2006 he served as vice president of sales and marketing at Scintera Networks. He is a director of Mythic, an artificial intelligence company in the San Francisco Bay Area, and he is also a director of Computacenter in the UK.

References

American chief executives
Living people
Arm Holdings people
Nvidia people
Year of birth missing (living people)
Stanford Graduate School of Business alumni
Clarkson University alumni
1960s births